Rochelle Pangilinan-Solinap (born May 23, 1982) is a Filipina dancer, actress and recording artist. She was one of the founding members of the popular group SexBomb Girls. In 2007, she repackaged herself as a short-term rap and hip-hop artist under the name RoC.

Biography
Rochelle "Riray" Pangilinan was born in Malabon, Philippines, and is one of three siblings. Her family was very poor, and her father, Rodolfo Pangilinan, was an alcoholic wife-beater. Her parents separated but reunited in 2000 after her father stopped drinking, but he died on November 11, 2007, of emphysema.

Career

Dancing career

Pangilinan entered dancing contests at a young age, and at age 14 was offered a job at Eat Bulaga!, a popular daytime variety show. She was only 14 when she first appeared on Eat Bulaga!. A group of dancers including Pangilinan were formed in November 1999 as the Chicken Sandwich Dancers, an offshoot of the Danz Focus (the resident dancers of Eat Bulaga!). At first, there were four (Cheryl, Debra, Janine, and Rochelle). The group expanded to six with the addition of Jopay and Aira, then eventually expanded to 8, 12, and then 13 (during their first FHM Philippines appearance) to an all-time high of 22. In 2000, the Tom Jones song, "Sexbomb", was a hit in the Philippines, and the group was named the SexBomb Dancers by their manager, Joy Cancio.

Singing career

In 2002, the singing group SexBomb Girls was formed, with members Jopay Paguia, Evette Pabalan, Weng Ibarra, Monique Icban, Izzy Trazona, and Pangilinan herself. In that same year, they released their debut album Unang Putok, with the hit single "Bakit Papa". They went on to later release three more albums.

Acting career
She started her acting career in ABS-CBN in Esperanza as Eliza starring Judy Ann Santos, Wowie de Guzman, Piolo Pascual, Angelika de la Cruz, Jericho Rosales, Marvin Agustin, Jolina Magdangal and Carmina Villarroel. In 2002, the SexBomb Girls starred in their first movie, Bakit Papa, with co-stars Allan K., Wendell Ramos, Epi Quizon, Chynna Ortaleza and Richard Gutierrez. In that same year, Pangilinan starred (without her group) in the movie Bertud ng Putik, where she was the leading lady of Bong Revilla, and rival to the character played by Regine Tolentino. She was also a regular on Daboy en Da Girl, a show on GMA KiliTV.

In 2003, the SexBomb Girls starred in Daisy Siete, a long-running, top-rating afternoon drama series on GMA Network, with Pangilinan playing a main character.

In 2004, Pangilinan appeared on Home Along Da Airport with co-star Dolphy, a show on ABS-CBN, GMA's rival network. After her appearance in the rival network, there were rumors that she would switch channels but she stated that she will not be leaving GMA. In 2005, she appeared on the TV show Darna as a mermaid named Corella, Darna's ally.

In early 2010, Pangilinan portrayed one of the main villains, Deborah/Babaeng Manananggal in Darna.

Recently, Pangilinan appeared as one of the lead characters, Marikit, on the Philippine historical drama Amaya.

Rochelle as RoC
Pangilinan stated on showbiz talk show S Files in March 2007 that she will be leaving the SexBomb Girls' roster for a short period of time and will not appear in the group's long-awaited return on Eat Bulaga!. During her leave of absence, she co-wrote and recorded songs along with established rap artists Michael V., Gloc-9, and fellow SexBomb Girls Evette Pabalan and Jovel Palomo, resulting in her debut rap album. She later returned to Eat Bulaga! as part of the dancing roster.

On June 3, 2007, Pangilinan introduced herself as RoC and launched her debut album Roc-A-Holic (released on June 8, 2007, by Panacea Music) on a weekly variety show, SOP Rules. The album consists of catchy rap, hip hop-flavored, and Latin-inspired songs, with the carrier single "Baile".

Personal life
Pangilinan married actor Arthur Solinap (cousin of actor host Dingdong Dantes) on August 8, 2017. She gave birth to their first child Shiloh Jayne on February 24, 2019.

Discography

Albums
with SexBomb Girls:
2002: Unang Putok (4× Platinum)
2003: Round 2 (5× Platinum)
2004: Bomb Thr3at (2× Platinum)
2005: Sumayaw, Sumunod: The Best of the Sexbomb Girls (Platinum)
2006: Daisy Siete V-Day
2008: Vaklushii

Solo albums:
2007: Roc-A-Holic

Filmography

Television

Films
 Labyu with an Accent (2022) as Daisy Santos
 Trip Ubusan: The Lolas vs. Zombies (2017)
 Fruits N' Vegetables: Mga Bulakboleros (2016) as University Lady Guard
 Bumulakabataan...Bulalakaw Waves (2016) as Sexy Dancer at Bar 
 Tandem (2015)
 Asintado (2014) 
 Fantastic Man (2003)
 Bertud ng Putik (2003)
 Bakit Papa? (2002)

Awards and nominations

References

External links

Rochelle Pangilinan at iGMA.tv

1982 births
Filipino dance musicians
Living people
People from Malabon
Filipino female dancers
21st-century Filipino actresses
21st-century Filipino women singers
SexBomb Girls members
GMA Network personalities